Saint-Maclou-de-Folleville is a commune in the Seine-Maritime department in the Normandy region in northern France.

Geography

Population

Places of interest
 The church of St. Maclou, dating from the eleventh century.
 Ruins of a sixteenth-century château.
 A working watermill.

See also
Communes of the Seine-Maritime department

References

Communes of Seine-Maritime